Pioneer Township may refer to:

 Pioneer Township, Cedar County, Iowa
 Pioneer Township, Graham County, Kansas
 Pioneer Township, Rice County, Kansas
 Pioneer Township, Rush County, Kansas, in Rush County, Kansas
 Pioneer Township, Michigan
 Pioneer Township, Barry County, Missouri
 Pioneer Township, Faulk County, South Dakota, in Faulk County, South Dakota

Township name disambiguation pages